Monachosorum is a genus of ferns described as a genus in 1848.

Monachosorum is native to eastern Asia.

Species
 Monachosorum davallioides Kunze - India, Nepal, Myanmar
 Monachosorum elegans Ching - Guangxi
 Monachosorum flagellare (Makino) Hayata - China, Japan
 Monachosorum henryi Christ - China, Bhutan, Assam, Myanmar, Nepal, Vietnam
 Monachosorum maximowiczii (Baker) Hayata - China, Japan

References

Dennstaedtiaceae
Fern genera